is a former Japanese football player.

Playing career
Mio was born in Yokohama on January 26, 1983. He joined J2 League club Ventforet Kofu from Shonan Bellmare youth team in 2001. He played many matches from first season. In 2002, he moved to J1 League club Kyoto Purple Sanga (later Kyoto Sanga FC). However he could hardly play in the match until 2003 and Sanga was relegated to J2 end of 2003 season. He played many matches under new manager Koichi Hashiratani from 2004. Sanga won the champions in 2005 season and was promoted to J1. Although he played many matches, Sanga finished at the bottom place in 2006 season. Manager Hashiratani resigned end of 2006 season and Mio could hardly play in the match in 2007 season. In 2008, he moved to J2 club Ventforet Kofu for the first time in 7 years. Although he played many matches in 2008 season, his opportunity to play decreased in 2009 season. In 2010, he moved to Japan Football League club Gainare Tottori. He played all 34 matches and Gainare won the champions in 2010 season. Gainare played in J2 from 2011 and he played many matches until 2012. In 2013, he moved to J2 club FC Gifu. Although he played as regular player in 2013, he could not play many matches in 2014 and retired end of 2014 season.

Club statistics

References

External links

1983 births
Living people
Association football people from Kanagawa Prefecture
Japanese footballers
J1 League players
J2 League players
Japan Football League players
Ventforet Kofu players
Kyoto Sanga FC players
Gainare Tottori players
FC Gifu players
Association football midfielders